The white-rumped monjita (Xolmis velatus) is a species of bird in the family Tyrannidae.
It is found in Bolivia, Brazil, Argentina and Paraguay.
Its natural habitats are dry savanna and pastureland.

References

white-rumped monjita
Birds of Bolivia
Birds of Brazil
white-rumped monjita
Taxonomy articles created by Polbot